The Acts of Andrew, is the earliest testimony of the acts and miracles of the Apostle Andrew. Prieur stated that "The distinctive christology of the text" and its lack of mention of church organisation, liturgy, and ecclesiastical rites, lead one to "militate for an early dating".

Prieur also stated that its "serene tone" and innocence of any polemic or disputes concerning its ideas or awareness of heterodoxy, particularly in the area of christology, show that "it derived from a period when the christology of the Great Church had not yet taken firm shape".

The episodic narratives in which Andrew figures survive incompletely in two manuscript traditions, aside from citations and fragments that are assumed to have come from lost sections. One is an early Coptic manuscript of part of one of the narratives, conserved at Utrecht University Library;  The other is embodied in the Greek Martyrium, supplemented by manuscripts that bring it to 65 chapters.

Traditionally the text is said to have been based on the Acts of John and the Acts of Peter, and even to have had the same author, the "Leucius Charinus" who is credited with all the 2nd-century romances. Like these works, the Acts of Andrew describes the supposed travels of the title character, the miracles he performed during them, and finally a description of his martyrdom.

Like those in the two books of Acts on which it appears based, the miracles are extremely supernatural, and highly extravagant. For example, aside from the usual miracles of raising the dead, healing the blind, and so forth, he survives being placed amongst fierce animals, calms storms, and defeats armies simply by crossing himself. There is also a great deal of moralising - Andrew causes an embryo which was illegitimate to die, and also rescues a boy from his incestuous mother, an act resulting in her laying false charges against them, requiring God to send an earthquake to free Andrew and the boy. So much does the text venture into the realm of extreme supernatural events, that, while being crucified, Andrew is still able to give sermons for three days.

Eusebius of Caesarea knew the work, which he dismissed as the production of a heretic and absurd. Gregory of Tours was delighted to find a copy and wrote a drastically reduced recension of it about 593, leaving out the parts for "which, because of its excessive verbosity, [it] was called by some apocryphal", for which he felt it had been condemned. His free version expunges the detail that the apostle's ascetic preaching induced the proconsul's wife to leave her husband—socially and morally unacceptable to a Merovingian audience— brings the narrative into conformity with catholic orthodoxy of his time, then adds new material.

The Acts of Andrew was often classed as a gnostic work before the library of Nag Hammadi clarified modern understanding of Gnosticism. In his book, Christianizing Homer: The Odyssey, Plato, and the Acts of Andrew, Dennis MacDonald posits the theory that the non-canonical Acts of Andrew was a Christian retelling of Homer's Odyssey.

Notes

References

External links
Early Christian Writings: M.R. James, editor, 1924. Acts of Andrew
The Acts of Andrew The Acts and Martyrdom of Andrew and The Acts of Andrew and Matthew 
Geoff Trowbridge, The "Whole" Bible
Catholic Encyclopedia

Andrew
Andrew the Apostle
2nd-century Christian texts